Diaan van Wyk (born 19 January 1981 in Roodepoort, Gauteng) is a South African right-handed batsman and wicketkeeper who plays for Gauteng in South African domestic cricket.

References
 Diaan van Wyk on Cricinfo

1981 births
Living people
People from Roodepoort
Gauteng cricketers
South African cricketers
Sportspeople from Gauteng